Sigrid Jahns (née Langer) (born on 26 October 1945) is a German historian. Until 2009 she was professor of early modern history at the Department of History of the Ludwig Maximilian University of Munich.

Life 
Born in Malente, the daughter of a physician, after her Abitur in Osnabrück in 1965,  Jahns began studying history, philology, philosophy and pedagogy, which she continued at the Christian-Albrechts-Universität zu Kiel in 1967 and at the Goethe University Frankfurt in 1968. In 1972, she received her doctorate in philosophy from Friedrich Hermann Schubert in Frankfurt with a dissertation entitled Frankfurt, Reformation and Schmalkaldic League - the Reformation, Reich and Alliance Politics of the Imperial City of Frankfurt am Main 1525-1536. Verfassung und Sozialstruktur eines höchsten Gerichts im Alten Reich, which deals with the lawyers at the Reichskammergericht from the perspective of social and constitutional history.

Publications 
 Frankfurt, Reformation und Schmalkaldischer Bund. Die Reformations-, Reichs- u. Bündnispolitik der Reichsstadt Frankfurt am Main 1525–1536. Kramer, Frankfurt 1976,  (zugl. University of Frankfurt, FB Geschichtswissenschaften 1972: Dissertation.)
 Die Assessoren des Reichskammergerichts in Wetzlar. Eine Fallstudie. Publication series of the Gesellschaft für Reichskammergerichtsforschung , issue 2, Wetzlar 1986, doi:10.17176/20170309-191119
 Das Reichskammergericht und seine Richter. Verfassung und Sozialstruktur eines höchsten Gerichts im Alten Reich. Part 1: Darstellung. Böhlau Verlag, Vienna, Cologne and Weimar 2011, 
 Das Reichskammergericht und seine Richter. Verfassung und Sozialstruktur eines höchsten Gerichts im Alten Reich. Part 2: Biographies. 2 volumes. Böhlau Verlag, Vienna, Cologne and Weimar 2003, 
 Juristenkarrieren in der Frühen Neuzeit.
 Die Assessoren des Reichskammergerichts in Wetzlar.
 Das Kammerkollegium des Reichskammergerichts im Verfassungs- und Sozialsystem des Alten Reiches.

References

External links 
 
 Die Professur „Geschichte der Frühen Neuzeit“: Prof. Dr. Sigrid Jahns. on geschichte.uni-muenchen.de
 Prof. Dr. Sigrid Jahns: Publikationen (Auswahl). on geschichte.uni-muenchen.de

1945 births
Living people
People from Schleswig-Holstein
20th-century German historians
21st-century German historians
German women historians
Academic staff of the Ludwig Maximilian University of Munich
20th-century German women
21st-century German women